Lachnagrostis limitanea (syn. Agrostis limitanea, Spalding blown grass) is a threatened plant native to South Australia.

References

Flora of South Australia
Pooideae